The 2011–12 Arkansas Razorbacks men's basketball team represented the University of Arkansas in the sport of basketball during the 2011–12 college basketball season. The Razorbacks competed in Division I of the National Collegiate Athletic Association (NCAA) and the Southeastern Conference (SEC). They were led by head coach Mike Anderson, and played their home games at Bud Walton Arena on the university's Fayetteville, Arkansas campus.

Previous season
The Razorbacks finished the 2010–11 season 18–13, 7–9 in SEC play and lost in the first round of the SEC tournament to Tennessee. Head coach John Pelphrey was fired following the season after compiling a 69–59 overall record during four years with Arkansas.

Roster

Schedule

|-
!colspan=9| Exhibition

|-
!colspan=9| Regular Season

|-
!colspan=9| SEC Regular Season

|-
!colspan=9| 2012 SEC tournament

|-

References

Arkansas
Arkansas Razorbacks men's basketball seasons
Razor
Razor